David Barr Kirtley (born 1977) is an American short story writer and the host of the Geek's Guide to the Galaxy podcast.

Writing
His short fiction appears in magazines such as Realms of Fantasy and Weird Tales, in online magazines such as Orson Scott Card's InterGalactic Medicine Show and Lightspeed, and on podcasts such as Escape Pod, Pseudopod, and The Drabblecast. In 2003, he was selected for the anthology New Voices in Science Fiction. In 2008, his story "Save Me Plz" was chosen for the anthology Fantasy: The Best of the Year. He was profiled in the 2008 Novel & Short Story Writer's Market as part of "Speculative Fiction: The Next Generation."

Early life
He is the son of physicist John R. Kirtley and grew up in Katonah, New York.

Education
From 1996-2000, he attended Colby College in Waterville, Maine, where he majored in government, with a minor in creative writing. In 1997, he won the Dell Magazines Award for undergraduate science fiction. In 1999 he attended the Clarion Workshop at Michigan State University. In 2009 he received an MFA in fiction and screenwriting from the University of Southern California.

Podcasting

Kirtley co-hosted the Geek's Guide to the Galaxy podcast along with fantasy & science fiction editor John Joseph Adams. Kirtley is now the sole host, though John Joseph Adams makes guest appearances.

Partial bibliography

Magazines
 "Beauty," Lightspeed, March 2012
 "The Ontological Factor," Cicada, September/October 2011
 "Cats in Victory," Lightspeed, June 2010
 "Red Road", Orson Scott Card's InterGalactic Medicine Show, Issue 9, July 2008
 "Transformations", Realms of Fantasy, December 2007
 "Save Me Plz", Realms of Fantasy, October 2007
 "Blood of Virgins", Realms of Fantasy, October 2006
 "The Trial of Thomas Jefferson," Cicada, July/August 2003
 "Seeds-for-Brains," Realms of Fantasy, June 2003
 "Seven Brothers, Cruel," Realms of Fantasy, December 2002
 "The Disciple," Weird Tales, Summer 2002
 "The Second Rat," On Spec, Spring 2002

Anthologies
 "Power Armor: A Love Story," Armored, Baen Books, March 2012
 "Three Deaths," Under the Moons of Mars, Simon & Schuster, February 2012
 "The Disciple," New Cthulhu, Prime Books, November 2011
 "Family Tree," The Way of the Wizard, Prime Books, November 2010
 "The Skull-Faced City," The Living Dead 2, Night Shade Books, September 2010
 "The Skull-Faced Boy", The Living Dead, Night Shade Books, September 2008
 "Save Me Plz," Fantasy: The Best of the Year, 2008 Edition, Prime Books, July 2008
 "The Black Bird," The Dragon Done It, Baen Books, March 2008
 "Veil of Ignorance," All the Rage This Year, Phobos Books, September 2004
 "The Black Bird," New Voices in Science Fiction, DAW Books, December 2003
 "The Prize," Empires of Dreams and Miracles, Phobos Books, September 2002
 "They Go Bump," Empire of Dreams and Miracles, Phobos Books, September 2002

References

External links
 David Barr Kirtley: Official Author Site

 Geek's Guide to the Galaxy.

1977 births
Living people
American fantasy writers
American horror writers
American science fiction writers
American short story writers
Colby College alumni
People from Katonah, New York
Novelists from New York (state)
Writers from Philadelphia
American male short story writers
American male novelists
Novelists from Pennsylvania